This is a list of regions in Manitoba, Canada, including Manitoba's geographic regions, economic regions, and health regions. These regions do not reflect the organization of local government in Manitoba. These areas exist solely for the purposes of statistical analysis and presentation; they have no government of their own.

Typically outlined by provincial or federal authorities, these formal and informal regional models broadly follow the geographic definitions, but have particular variations depending on their administrative or other purpose.

Geographic regions 

These are informal geographic regions, accompanied by the census divisions in each. Unlike in some other provinces, census divisions in Manitoba do not reflect the organization of local government: these areas exist solely for the purposes of statistical analysis and presentation; they have no government of their own.

Provincial regions

Central Manitoba 

Interlake
 North Interlake (Division No. 18)
 Selkirk Area (Division No. 13) 
 South Interlake (Division No. 14)
Parkland
 Dauphin (Division No. 17)
 Roblin, Russell, Rossburn Area (Division No. 16)
 Swan Valley (Division No. 20)

Northern Manitoba

 Northern (Norman or Nor-Man) — this region was added to the province in 1912, and includes all land north of the 52nd parallel.
 Churchill/Northern Manitoba (Division No. 23)
 Flin Flon/North West (Division No. 21)
 North East Manitoba, or North Eastman (Division No. 19)
 Thompson/North Central (Division No. 22)

Southern Manitoba 
Southern Manitoba includes:

Central Plains — north-central Manitoba
 Central Manitoba (Division No. 8)
 Portage la Prairie Area (Division No. 9)
 Whitehorse Plains (Division No. 10)
Eastman — southeast Manitoba
 Beausejour Area (Division No. 12)
 Eastern Manitoba (Division No. 1)
 Steinbach Area (Division No. 2)
Pembina Valley — south-central Manitoba
 Pembina Valley (Division No. 3)
 Pilot Mound Area (Division No. 4)
 Westman — southwest Manitoba
 Brandon Area (Division No. 7)
 South West Area (Division No. 5)
 Virden Area (Division No. 6)
 Western Manitoba (Division No. 15)
 Winnipeg Capital Region — Includes the 16 municipalities identified in Manitoba's Capital Region Partnership Act. As such, unlike the other regions, this region also includes municipalities that are components of the other regions that border it.
 Winnipeg census division (Division No. 11):
 City of Winnipeg
 Headingley
 Three rural municipalities from the Central Plains Region (Division 10 in its entirety):
 Cartier
 Macdonald
 St. François Xavier
 Three rural municipalities from the Eastman Region (portions of Divisions 2 and 12):
 Ritchot
 Springfield
 Taché
 Eight rural municipalities from the Interlake Region (all of Division 13 and part of Division 14):
 East St. Paul
 Rockwood
 Rosser
 Selkirk
 St. Andrews
 St. Clements
 Stonewall
 West St. Paul

Extraterritorial regions 
In the broader context of Canada's 7 primary regions, as well as those of North America's various regions, Manitoba can be considered by the following physiographic regions:

 Hudson Bay Lowlands
 Canadian Shield
 Interior Plains
 Red River Valley
 Western Canada
 Canadian Prairies

Economic regions

The economic regions of Manitoba are defined by Statistics Canada. Manitoba is broken into 8 economic regions, each with its own competitive advantages and potential opportunities. These regions also include "self-contained labour areas," or SLAs, which are local geographic areas in Manitoba where people live and work and that have a minimum population of 3,000 and a minimum tax base of CA$130 million. These areas are solely based on economic relationships that exist between neighbouring towns and municipalities.

Manitoba's 8 economic regions include the following.

Rural Manitoba:

 Southeast Economic Region — comprising all of the Eastman region (census divisions 1, 2, and 12), and can be further broken down into the following SLAs:
 Beausejour Brokenhead Area
 Emerson Area
 Hanover Area
 La Broquerie Area
 Lac du Bonnet Area
 Niverville Area
 Powerview-Pine Falls Area
 Ritchot Area
 Springfield Area
 St. Pierre-Jolys Area
 Steinbach Area
 Stuartburn Area
 Taché Area
 South Central Economic Region — comprising all of the Pembina Valley region (census divisions 3 and 4), and can further be broken down into the following SLAs:
 Altona Area
 Carman Area
 Cartwright Area
 Manitou Area
 Morris Area
 Winkler Area
 Southwest Economic Region — comprising all of the Westman region (census divisions 5, 6, 7, and 15), and can further be broken down into the following SLAs:
 Boissevain Area
 Brandon Area
 Hamiota Area
 Killarney Area
 Melita Area
 Minnedosa Area
 Neepawa Area
 Rivers Area
 Souris Area
 Virden Area
 Wawanesa Area
 North Central Economic Region — comprising all of the Central Plains region (census divisions 8, 9, and 10), and can further be broken down into the following SLAs:
 Gladstone Area
 Macdonald Area
 Portage la Prairie Area
 St. Francois Xavier Area
 Treherne Area
 Interlake Economic Region — comprising all of the Interlake region (census divisions 13, 14, and 18), and can further be broken down into the following SLAs:
 Arborg Area
 East St. Paul Area
 Gimli Area
 Selkirk Area
 St. Andrews Area
 St. Clements Area
 St. Laurent Area
 Stonewall Area
 West St. Paul Area
 Woodlands Area
 Parkland Economic Region — comprising all of the Parkland region (census divisions 17, 16, and 20), and can further be broken down into the following SLAs:
 Dauphin Area
 Grandview Area
 Roblin Area
 Russell Area
 Ste. Rose Area
 Swan Valley Area

Northern Manitoba:

 North Economic Region — comprising all of the Norman region (census divisions 19, 21, 22, and 23), and can further be broken down into the following SLAs:
 Churchill Area
 Flin Flon Area
 Gillam Area
 Grand Rapids Area
 Leaf Rapids Area
 Lynn Lake Area
 Snow Lake Area
 The Pas Area
 Thompson Area

Winnipeg:

 Winnipeg Economic Region — comprising census division 11 (City of Winnipeg and Rural Municipality of Headingley); it does not include the Metro Region.

EI regions 
The Government of Canada has its own economic regions created for the provision of employment Insurance (EI) in each province/territory. These "Employment Insurance Economic Regions" are defined by the federal Employment Insurance Act and Regulations.

 EI Region of Winnipeg (EI Region #39) — includes Brokenhead 4, East St. Paul, Headingley, Ritchot, Rosser, Springfield, St. Clements, St. François Xavier, Taché, West St. Paul, and Winnipeg.
 EI Region of Southern Manitoba (EI Region #40) — includes census divisions 2, 13, and 14, as well as the entirety of the Central Plains, Interlake, Parkland, Pembina Valley, and Westman regions.
 EI Region of Northern Manitoba (EI Region #41) — includes census divisions 1, 12, and 18, as well as the entirety of the Northern Region

Health regions 

Manitoba is also broken down into health regions, which are defined by their respective health authorities, called Regional Health Authorities (RHAs).

The 5 health regions, and their respective RHAs, that exist today were created as an amalgamation of 11 regions and authorities that were merged in 2012:

 Interlake-Eastern health region — comprising the geographic regions of Interlake and North Eastman
 Northern Health health region — comprising the geographic region of Northern Manitoba (excluding Churchill)
 Prairie Mountain health region — comprising southwestern Manitoba, including the geographic regions of Westman and Parkland
 Southern Health-Santé Sud — comprising the geographic region of Pembina Valley and South Eastman (census districts 1 and 2)
 Winnipeg health region — comprising the City of Winnipeg, the northern community of Churchill, and the Rural Municipalities of East and West St. Paul,

Other

Schools 

School divisions and districts in Manitoba are also divided into regions:

 Central — roughly includes the regions of Central Plains and Pembina Valley
 Northern/Remote — includes Northern Manitoba and parts of census divisions 1, 9, and 20
 Parkland/Westman — roughly includes the regions of Westman and Parkland (excluding parts of census division 20)
 Southeast/Interlake — roughly includes the regions of Interlake and Eastman (excluding parts of census division 1)
 Winnipeg — City of Winnipeg

Treaties 
Manitoba can also be divided by its First Nations treaties, as part of the Numbered Treaties of Canada. Some include portions of other provinces.

 Treaty 1 — comprising Winnipeg (census division 11), and southern Manitoba—roughly the regions of Central Plains, Pembina Valley, and Interlake (excluding northern half of census division 18)
 Treaty 2  — comprising southern Manitoba—roughly the Westman Region, census division 17, parts of division 16, southern part of division 19, and northern part of division 18
 Treaty 3 — roughly comprising census division 1; and the Lake of the Woods area of southeastern Ontario
 Treaty 4 — roughly comprising census division 20, the non-contiguous western portion of division 19, and small, westward portion of division 16; and the Qu’Appelle area of southern Saskatchewan
 Treaty 5 — comprising central-northern Manitoba—roughly Northern Manitoba (excluding a portion of division 19; and the furthest-east portion of census division 23, which does not belong to a Manitoba treaty)

Manitoba Metis Federation regions 
The Manitoba Metis Federation, which is the official self-governing political organization for Métis people in Manitoba, uses a regionally-based governance structure wherein the MMF is organized into regional associations that are made up of local associations.

The Manitoba Metis Federation regions, for which the boundaries are established by the MMF Board of Directors, are:

 Northwest Region
 The Pas Region
 Thompson Region
 Interlake Region
 Southeast Region
 Southwest Region
 Winnipeg Region

See also

Administrative divisions of Canada
List of census divisions of Manitoba
List of communities in Manitoba
List of former counties of Manitoba
List of municipalities in Manitoba
List of rural municipalities in Manitoba
List of regions of Canada

References

External links 
 Government of Manitoba Community Profiles:
 Regional Map.
 Municipality Profiles.
https://www.brandonu.ca/rdi/files/2017/01/Report-3-Admin-Regions-in-MB-Jan24.pdf